Rockwall is a city in Rockwall County, Texas, United States, which is part of the Dallas/Fort Worth metroplex. It is the county seat of Rockwall County. The U.S. Census Bureau estimate's As of the 2020 census, Rockwall's population is 47,251.  That's up from 45,888 in 2019. The name Rockwall is derived from a naturally jointed geological formation, which has the appearance of an artificial wall.

History
The association of Paleo-Indian artifacts with extinct Pleistocene mammal remains in various archeological sites within the Texas Prairie-Savannah Region of eastern North Central Texas, including a site in Collin County, and Clovis points recovered from the Brushy Creek Clovis Site in Hunt County demonstrates that the Rockwall region was occupied by prehistoric Native American cultures at least as far back as 13,500 to 13,000 years ago. More recently, the Rockwall region was occupied by Caddo Indians. Creek Indians moved to the area in the early 19th century.

In 1851, the first Anglo-American settlers moved to the area, and wells were dug. During the digging, they found large underground rock walls that were initially believed to be man-made. Later study of the wall-like features by geologists and archaeologists found them to be jointed, natural sandstone dikes that had intruded Cretaceous marl. The wall, when viewed from above, runs in long straight lines with angles that form a near perfect rectangle. The eastern wall has several deviations that run in straight lines with sharp angles, which would be unusual for a natural formation in an already unusual closed loop wall formation.

The town was established April 17, 1854 and named after these natural rock walls. While originally part of Kaufman County, in 1873, Rockwall County was formed with Rockwall being the county seat.

Geography

Rockwall is on the east shore of Lake Ray Hubbard about 20 miles northeast of Dallas.  It is on state highways 205 and 66, north of Interstate 30.

Climate
The climate in this area is characterized by hot, humid summers and generally mild to cool winters.  According to the Köppen Climate Classification system, Rockwall has a humid subtropical climate, abbreviated "Cfa" on climate maps.

Demographics

As of the 2020 United States census, there were 47,251 people, 16,151 households, and 12,771 families residing in the city.

Economy 
According to the city's 2014 Comprehensive Annual Financial Report, the top employers in the city are:

Government

Local government

According to the city's most recent Comprehensive Annual Financial Report Fund Financial Statements, the city's various funds had $39.0 million in Revenues, $42.2 million in expenditures, $32.3 million in total assets, $3.6 million in total liabilities, and $25.9 million in investments.

The structure of the management and coordination of city services is:

The city of Rockwall is a voluntary member of the North Central Texas Council of Governments association, the purpose of which is to coordinate individual and collective local governments and facilitate regional solutions, eliminate unnecessary duplication, and enable joint decisions.

State government
Rockwall is represented in the Texas Senate by Republican Bob Hall, District 2, and in the Texas House of Representatives by Republican Justin Holland, District 33.

Federal government
At the Federal level, the two U.S. Senators from Texas are Republicans John Cornyn and Ted Cruz; Rockwall is part of Texas' US Congressional 4th District, which is currently represented by Republican Pat Fallon.

Education

Public schools 
The city is served by the Rockwall Independent School District.
There are two public high schools in Rockwall: Rockwall High School and Rockwall-Heath High School. There are sixteen elementary schools, three middle schools, and two high schools in Rockwall.

Higher education 
The city is home to the Higher Education Center at Rockwall, which is part of the community college district, Collin College. The campus is the District's first campus outside of Collin County itself.  Texas A&M University-Commerce holds classes at the center. Texas A&M University-Commerce also has a campus located at the Rockwall Technology Park.

Transportation 
Rockwall is served by the following highways that run through the city:

  Interstate 30
  U.S. Highway 67 (runs concurrent with Interstate 30)
  State Highway 66
  State Highway 205
  State Highway 276
  Farm to Market 549
  Farm to Market 552
  Farm to Market 740

Ralph M. Hall/Rockwall Municipal Airport is located two miles east of the city and is used mostly by small general aviation aircraft.

Sports 
Rockwall offers many different sports complexes as well as activities. Airport Road boasts baseball fields, as well as the Landing Point complex containing the Texas International Fencing Center, zipline and dance facilities.  The Rockwall Indoor Sports Expo is located on South 205.  Lake Ray Hubbard has several boating marinas and is used for jet skiing.

Rockwall also offers 2 different Golf Courses  within 17 miles of the center of Rockwall.

Notable people

 Jason Castro, top 12 contestant on season 7 of American Idol
 Joe Driver, Texas State Representative from 1993 to 2013
 Allie Gonino, singer, actress, and violinist who played Laurel Mercer in The Lying Game
 Cliff Harris, professional football safety who played for the Dallas Cowboys
 Alex Jones, conservative radio show host and conspiracy theorist who grew up in Rockwall during the 1980s and early 1990s
 Larry Lea, former televangelist whose ministry was based in Rockwall during the 1980s and early 1990s
 Mason Musso, lead singer and guitarist in Metro Station
 Mitchel Musso, actor
 Marina Oswald Porter, widow of Lee Harvey Oswald
 Amar Sandhu, first American-born Punjabi singer
 Andy Tanner, former wide receiver for the New Orleans Saints
 Travis Tedford, former child actor best known for portraying Spanky McFarland in the 1994 feature film The Little Rascals

Popular culture
In 2013, forensic geologist, Scott Wolter, on the television show America Unearthed, visited Rockwall to investigate the claims that the wall might have been manmade, and the conclusion of the episode was that the underground structure was natural and not man-made.

Sister cities

Rockwall’s sister cities are:
 Cairo, Egypt
 Singapore
 Luxembourg, Luxembourg
 Belfast, United Kingdom
 Mumbai, India
 Peshawar, Pakistan
 Honolulu, Hawaii
 Tokyo, Japan
 Seoul, South Korea
 Cape Town, South Africa
 Venice, Italy
 Cardiff, United Kingdom
 Cayenne, French Guiana

References

External links
 The City of Rockwall Home Page

Dallas–Fort Worth metroplex
Cities in Rockwall County, Texas
Cities in Texas
County seats in Texas
Populated places established in 1854
1854 establishments in Texas